Kapangan, officially the Municipality of Kapangan, , is a 4th class municipality in the province of Benguet, Philippines. According to the 2020 census, it has a population of 19,297 people.

History

Pre-colonial period
Kapangan was formerly called Takdang (or Tacdang), which means "people from the east". The early natives, who came from eastern settlements such as Tinec in Buguias and Bontoc, settled along the Amburayan River and lived by the kaingin system. They traveled to Naguilian in La Union to trade goods with the Ilocano people The appointed first town president (before now mayor) is Espiritu Cariño (1898-1900) .

Spanish period
During the Spanish Regime, Kapangan was organized into four barrios; Balacbac, Paykek, Pongayan, and Taba-ao. The Spaniards appointed Espiritu Cariño as the first Capitan del Barrio, whose duty was overseeing tax collection from local land owners. They also appointed Juan Ora-a Cariño to the position, eventually promoting him to Commandantes, one of the highest ranks in office during the time. Both Espiritu Cariño and Juan Ora-a Cariño appointed eight people in eight different barrios to serve as barrio capitans, whose tasks were to oversee the construction of Spanish trails throughout the mountain region.

American period
Under the American Civil Government, Kapangan was established as one of the 19 townships of the province of Benguet, upon the issuance of Act No. 48 on November 22, 1900

On August 13, 1908, Benguet was established as a sub-province of the newly created Mountain Province with the enactment of  Act No. 1876. Six townships of Benguet were later abolished, one of which was Balakbak, which was integrated into the township of Kapangan.

According to some stories, Kapangan got its name when an American once asked a local resident what was the name of the place and since the resident doesn't understand English and so happened that they were about to eat in the party where they were in, she just said "kapangan" which means go eat in English and the American thought that the name of the place is Kapangan and hence the name .

Post-war era
On June 25, 1963, then-President Diosdado Macapagal issued Executive Order No. 42 converting eight (8) of the thirteen (13) towns (designated as municipal districts) of Benguet sub-province into regular municipalities. Kapangan was among them.

On June 18, 1966, the sub-province of Benguet was separated from the old Mountain Province and was converted into a regular province. Kapangan remained to be a component municipality of the newly established province.

Geography
Kapangan is at the mid-western section of Benguet. It is bounded by Kibungan on the north-east, Atok on the east, Tublay on the southeast, Sablan and Bagulin on the south-west, San Gabriel on the mid-west, and Sugpon on the north-west.

According to the Philippine Statistics Authority, the municipality has a land area of  constituting  of the  total area of Benguet.

The municipal's terrain is characterized by rugged mountains and hills. Rugged mountains have slopes of 50% while hills have slopes from 30%-50%.

Barangays
Kapangan is politically subdivided into 15 barangays. These barangays are headed by elected officials: Barangay Captain, Barangay Council, whose members are called Barangay Councilors. All are elected every three years.

Climate

Climate is divided into two seasons - the wet and the dry. Wet season occurs from May to October while dry season occurs November to April.

Demographics

In the 2020 census, Kapangan had a population of 19,297.

Religion

 Ascension Episcopal Mission, Cabilisan, Pudong
 Balakbak Southern Baptist Church, Balakbak
 Duntog Kalbaryo Lutheran Church, Balakbak
 Iglesia ni Cristo, Lokal ng Balakbak
 Iglesia ni Cristo, Lokal ng Kapangan
 Kingdom Hall of Jehovah's Witnesses, Central
 Mount Zion Lutheran Church, Liblibeng, Gadang
 Taba-ao Faith Baptist Church, Taba-ao 
 Saint Andrew's Episcopal Parish, Paykek
 Saint Luke Lutheran Church, Taba-ao
 Saint Mark Episcopal Mission, Gadang
 Saint Mark Lutheran Church, Landing, Sagubo
 Saint Michael Catholic Mission, Labueg
 Solid Foundation Bible Baptist Church, Lomon

Economy

Government
Kapangan, belonging to the lone congressional district of the province of Benguet, is governed by a mayor designated as its local chief executive and by a municipal council as its legislative body in accordance with the Local Government Code. The mayor, vice mayor, and the councilors are elected directly by the people through an election which is being held every three years.

Elected officials

Education

Public schools
As of 2014, Kapangan has 27 public elementary schools and 4 public secondary schools.

Notes

References

External links
 [ Philippine Standard Geographic Code]

Municipalities of Benguet